"Movement" is a song recorded by Irish singer-songwriter Hozier for his second studio album, Wasteland, Baby!. It was released on 6 September 2018 as the second single from the record, peaking at number forty on the Irish Singles Chart.

Writing and composition
"Movement" is the third track from the album, written solely by Hozier. "Movement" was first written on the piano, and is a gospel-pop and R&B ballad with "intense emotionality", "twinkling' keys and organs, and slow-build, stomp-clap to the track. The lyrics reference "Jonah on the ocean" and Fred Astaire, illustrating "the summons of love as an awe-inspiring dance."

Critical reception
"Movement" received mixed reviews from critics. Billboard praised the track, saying "the emotional song touches on the beauty of movement, as Hozier sings about watching the subject dancing freely." while NPR stated that ""Movement," leans hard into Hozier's gifts for crafting songs that radiate waves of soaring intensity [...] and drama build[s] quietly." Pitchfork dismissed it, writing that the "murk of [the song mostly invites you to avert eye contact from the back of the room"  while The Independent likened it to a "church march to which the bride enters a disappointing wedding night."

Commercial performance
The song peaked at number eleven on the Billboard Digital Sales Chart.

Music video
The official music video for "Movement" was released on 14 November 2018. The video was directed by British filmmakers Chris Barrett and Luke Taylor and featured dancer Sergei Polunin, paying tribute to the "emotional physicality of dance" alongside the lyrics. The video has amassed over 21 million views on YouTube.

Personnel
Credits adapted from Tidal.
 A. Hozier-Byrne – Producer, composer, lyricist, associated performer, clapping, guitar, vocals
 Markus Dravs – Producer, associated performer, clapping, programming, synthesizer, vocal production
 Alex Ryan – Associated Performer, bass (vocal), clapping, piano, rhodes
 Booker T. Jones – Associated Performer, organ
 Iain Berryman – Associated Performer, clapping, engineer, studio personnel
 Paul Clarvis – Associated Performer, bass, shaker
 Rory Doyle – Associated Performer, clapping, drums
 Nathaniel Graham – Asst. Recording Engineer, studio personnel
 Robbie Nelson – Asst. Recording Engineer, studio personnel
 Greg Calbi – Mastering Engineer, studio personnel
 Andrew Scheps – Mixer, studio personnel

Charts

Certifications

References

2010s ballads
2018 songs
2018 singles
Gospel songs
Pop ballads
Rhythm and blues ballads
Hozier (musician) songs
Songs written by Hozier (musician)